James Killick (26 August 181629 October 1889) was a British sea captain, shipowner and entrepreneur. He founded Killick Martin & Company with James Henry Martin.

Biography

Early life
Captain James Killick was born in the Surrey village of Cheam on 26 August 1816. His family had lived in Cheam since 1741 when John Killick obtained a lease on a late fifteenth century house known as Whitehall.

James Killick was apprenticed to Captain Bowlby, part owner and Captain of the ‘Ganges’ on 1 August 1833, and went to sea for the first time at the age of 16. The ‘Ganges’ was a brig, built in Sunderland in 1825. The ‘Ganges’ was engaged in the Baltic Sea trade and is recorded as making a voyage to St.Petersburg during James Killick's apprenticeship.

Ships Master 
The ships in which James Killick served between 1837 and 1840 are unknown, but he is recorded by the Canton Press as being in command of the barque ‘Arun’ in Canton during December 1841. ‘Arun’ was built in Littlehampton, England in 1840, so its most likely that he had been appointed Master for her outward journey during 1841.

On 7 May 1845 James Killick is recorded as taking command of ‘John Dugdale’ built in Whitehaven in 1834. He relinquished his command of the vessel in 1851. During this time Captain James Killick made frequent journeys between China and the UK. Examples are passages during 1848–49 (10 November to 19 March; Woosung to London in 129 days) and 1851 (4 January to 3 May; Shanghai to London in 119 days).

Captaincy 
During 1849 James Killick obtained his master's certificate from Liverpool Custom's Authorities, and in 1852 he exchanged it under new regulations for a Board of Trade certificate of competency in London.

Challenger 
Captain James Killick took command of a new ship. The ‘Challenger’ which was launched on 23 December and departed on her maiden voyage on 21 February 1852.

Challenger was built by Richard Green and Henry Green at the Blackwell Yard.

She was the 291st ship built by the yard and was a remarkable departure from the previous ships produced. In 1850 the American clipper ship ‘Oriental’ visited West India Docks, the largest clipper ship to visit London and the Admiralty was given permission to take her lines, and this was done by Messrs Waymouth and Cornish, both Lloyd's Surveyors, in the dry dock at Green's Yard in Blackwell. This is probably the reason that it was said that Challenger's design was inspired by and had a close resemblance to the Oriental's. Under Captain James Killick's command Challenger loaded tea at Shanghai on 28 July 1852 and set for London, calling in at Anjer, where she met the American ship, Challenge, which was set for London, with a cargo of tea from Canton. The Challenge was a larger vessel of 2,000 tones, an extreme clipper built expressly for speed and capacity, and was the largest clipper built by the Americans to date. A race to London was commenced by the two vessels, the smaller British clipper arriving in London two days ahead of her larger rival. The news of the British win inspired the efforts of British owners to compete with the Americans and capture the China tea trade.

On 8 August 1853 Captain James Killick commenced another race with Challenger against the American clipper Nightingale from Shanghai. Challenger reached Deal on 26 November, 2 days earlier than Nightingale.

Under Captain James Killick command Challenger took an average journey time from Shanghai and Hankow of 115 days. After he relinquished command this extended to an average of 129 days. Captain James Killick's last passage in Challenger ended in December 1860 when she arrived in London with a transit from Shanghai of 108 days.

Killick Martin, Killick Martin and Company 
In 1861 Captain James Killick together with James Henry Martin created a business partnership to own and operate ships called Killick Martin. Killick was the senior partner and his seafaring background gave him the necessary experience to manage the ship owning side of the business. James Martin, twenty years younger than Killick, had previously worked for Phillips, Shaw & Lowther, which later changed its name to Shaw, Lowther and Maxton (owners of famous clipper ships like Ariel and Titania) concentrated on the running of the office and securing of cargo.

In 1863 the company name was changed to Killick Martin & Company when David William Richie became a partner. The company was later incorporated in 1953 to become Killick Martin & Company Ltd.

Between 1862 and 1879 Killick Martin and Killick Martin & Company owned 20 clipper ships, including Challenger which they acquired in 1865, which was the ship Captained by James Killick himself in the tea races against the American ships Challenge and Nightingale. Other famous ships owned by Killick Martin included, Lothair, Kaisow, which was painted by Montague Dawson and Wylo, painted by James Brereton.

Basil Lubbock and David MacGregor in their various publications mention in his later life Captain James Killick became affectionately known as the ‘China Bird’ and the ‘Admiral’ and when he died in Margate, Kent, on 29 October 1889 some of his obituaries referred to these ‘nick names’ and show the high regard and respect which his friends and colleagues held for him.

Legacy
Sutton Cultural Services, part of Sutton Council, have an archive on Captain James Killick and regularly hold free to enter exhibitions on his life at his former family home in Whitehall, Cheam, Surrey. Whitehall which is English Natural Heritage listed was also restored by Sutton Council in 2018 with the aid of a £1.9 million grant from the National Lottery.

Killick Martin's House Flag is held within the National Maritime Museum, and a builder's model of Lothair in the Hong Kong Museum of History.

References

Further reading

 The China Clippers by Basil Lubbock 1914.
The Tea Clippers 1833–1875 by David MacGregor (1983 enlarged and revised) 
Clipper Ships by David MacGregor (1979)

External links
Sutton Cultural Services 
Killick Martin & Company owned ships 
UK Tea & Infusions Association  
The David MacGregor Library
Friends of Whitehall
Clyde Ships
RMG
Rotherhithe Ship Building
Killick Martin & Company

19th-century British businesspeople
1816 births
1889 deaths
British sailors
British businesspeople in shipping